Papurana novaeguineae is a species of true frog, family Ranidae. It is endemic to southern New Guinea and occurs between Lake Yamur (West Papua, Indonesia) and Purari River (Papua New Guinea). Common name New Guinea frog has been coined for it.

Description
Papurana novaeguineae is the smallest Papurana species in New Guinea: males reach maturity below  and females below  in snout–vent length; these lengths have also been interpreted as the maximum sizes. Although it could be mixed with juveniles of other species, P. novaeguineae  is easy to distinguish from its relatives because it has reduced webbing between the toes: the fourth toe has the last two phalanges free of webbing (one free phalanx or none in other species). The nostrils are relatively widely separated.

The male advertisement call is a short series of pulsed notes with a "ringing" quality. The dominant frequency is about 3 kHz.

Habitat and conservation
It is locally abundant. Breeding takes place in permanent swamps and temporary grassy flooded ditches. No significant threats to this species have been identified. It occurs in several protected areas.

References

novaeguineae
Amphibians of Papua New Guinea
Amphibians of Western New Guinea
Amphibians described in 1909
Taxa named by Pieter Nicolaas van Kampen